The 1976 United States Senate election in Pennsylvania was held on November 2, 1976. Incumbent Republican U.S. Senator and Minority Leader Hugh Scott decided to retire. Republican John Heinz won the open seat.

Background
In December 1975, U.S. senator Hugh Scott announced that he would not seek re-election in 1976 at the age of 75 after serving in Congress for 33 years. Scott listed personal reasons and several "well-qualified potential candidates" for the seat among the reasons of his decision to retire. Other reasons, including his support for Richard Nixon and accusations that he had illegally obtained contributions from Gulf Oil were alleged to have contributed to the decision.

Republican primary

Candidates
C. Homer Brown
Mary Ellen Foltz
John Heinz, U.S. Representative from Pittsburgh since 1971
George Packard, former managing editor of the Philadelphia Bulletin
Arlen Specter, former District Attorney of Philadelphia
Francis Worley, former State Representative from Adams County

Results

Democratic primary

Candidates
Bill Green, U.S. Representative from Philadelphia
Jeanette Reibman, State Senator from Easton

Results

General election

Candidates
William Green, U.S. Representative from Philadelphia (Democratic)
John Heinz, U.S. Representative from Pittsburgh (Republican)
Frank Kinces (Communist)
Bernard Salera (Labor)
Frederick W. Stanton (Socialist Workers)
Andrew J. Watson (Constitution)

Campaign
Heinz was the victor in all but nine counties, defeating opponent William Green, who had a 300,000 vote advantage in his native Philadelphia area. Heinz and Green spent $2.5 million and $900,000, respectively, during the ten-month campaign. Much of the money Heinz spent on his campaign was his own, leading to accusations from Green that he was "buying the seat". Heinz replied to this by claiming that the spending was necessary to overcome the Democratic voter registration advantage.

Results

See also 
 1976 United States Senate elections

References

Pennsylvania
1976
1976 Pennsylvania elections